The Four Sages, Assessors, or Correlates are four eminent Chinese philosophers in the Confucian tradition. They are traditionally accorded a kind of sainthood and their spirit tablets are prominently placed in Confucian temples, two upon the east and two upon the west side of the Hall of the Great Completion (Dacheng Dian).

The Four Sages are:
 Yan Hui (521–481 BC), Confucius's favourite disciple, one of the main characters in Analects
 Zengzi or Zeng Shen (505–435 BC), another disciple of Confucius and author of the Great Learning
 Zisi or Kong Ji (481–402 BCE), Confucius's grandson, student of Zengzi, and author of the Doctrine of the Mean 
 Mencius or Master Meng (372–289 BC), student of Zisi and author of the Mencius.

Within a traditional Confucian temple, Yan Hui's tablet is placed first to the east of Confucius.

The families of the descendants of the Four Sages 四氏 still hold hereditary offices in the Republic of China (Taiwan) such as the Sacrificial Official to Confucius, "Sacrificial Official to Mencius", "Sacrificial Official to Zengzi", and "Sacrificial Official to Yan Hui". They use generation poems for their names given to them by the Ming and Qing Emperors.

希言公彥承，宏聞貞尚衍；
興毓傳繼廣，昭憲慶繁祥；
令德維垂佑，欽紹念顯揚；
建道敦安定，懋修肇彝常；
裕文煥景瑞，永錫世緒昌。

See also
 Confucianism
 Disciples of Confucius
 Twelve Philosophers
 Kong Family Mansion
 Temple of Confucius, Qufu
 Cemetery of Confucius
 Temple of Zengzi 曾廟
 Mencius's sites- Meng family mansion 孟府, Temple of Mencius 孟廟, and Cemetery of Mencius 孟林.
 Temple of Yan Hui
 Zhu Xi (朱熹) (October 18, 1130 – April 23, 1200), was a Chinese Confucian scholar philosopher and government official of Song dynasty China, who was influential in the development of Neo-Confucianism

Sources

Zhou dynasty philosophers
Chinese Confucianists